Alexander Delos "Boss" Jones (1818–1897), also known as A.D. (Boss) Jones or Boss Jones, was an American master carpenter and architect who designed and built a number of notable Greek Revival style farmhouses in Schenectady County, New York. He also built two notable Octagon houses.  His work was based in Duanesburg, New York. Some of his buildings employed innovative stacked plank construction. Eight of his notable works were covered in a study of Boss Jones Thematic Resources and listed on the National Register of Historic Places in 1984.

Selected works
Avery Farmhouse, c. 1850
Becker Farmhouse, c. 1850
Alexander Liddle Farmhouse, c. 1850
Robert Liddle Farmhouse, c. 1850
Jenkins Octagon House, c. 1855
Ladd Farmhouse, c. 1855
Shute Octagon House, c. 1855
A.D. (Boss) Jones House, c. 1860

References

1818 births
1897 deaths
19th-century American architects
Architects from New York (state)
People from Columbia County, New York
People from Duanesburg, New York